This is a list of medical schools in Israel.

Northern District
 Azrieli Faculty of Medicine of Bar-Ilan University

Haifa District
 Rappaport Faculty of Medicine of the Technion – Israel Institute of Technology

Central District
None.

Tel Aviv District
 Sackler Faculty of Medicine of Tel Aviv University

Jerusalem District
 Hadassah School of Medicine of the Hebrew University of Jerusalem

Southern District
 Joyce and Irving Goldman Medical School of Ben-Gurion University of the Negev

Medical schools
Medical Schools
Israel